Decades of the New World (De orbe novo decades) by Peter Martyr is a series of letters and reports of the early explorations of Central and South America that was published beginning 1511 and later anthologized. Being among the earliest such reports, Decades are of great value in the history of geography and discovery and describe the early contacts of Europeans and Native Americans derived from the narrative of the voyages of Christopher Columbus in the Caribbean and the reports from Hernán Cortés's Mexican expedition.

The Decades consisted of eight reports, two of which Martyr had previously sent as letters describing the voyages of Columbus, to Cardinal Ascanius Sforza in 1493 and 1494.  In 1501 Martyr, as requested by the Cardinal of Aragon, added eight chapters on the voyage of Columbus and the exploits of Martin Alonzo Pinzón.  In 1511 he added a supplement giving an account of events from 1501 to 1511. By 1516 he had finished two other Decades:

 The first was devoted to the exploits of Alonso de Ojeda, Diego de Nicuesa, and Vasco Núñez de Balboa. It was first published against his consent in a Venetian-Italian summary in Venice in 1504, reprinted in 1507, and published in a Latin translation in 1508. The original Latin text was published in 1511.
 The second gave an account of Balboa's discovery of the Pacific Ocean, Columbus' fourth voyage, and the expeditions of Pedrarias Dávila.
 The first three appeared together at Alcalá de Henares in 1516 under the title: De orbe novo decades cum Legatione Babylonica.
 The Enchiridion de nuper sub D. Carolo repertis insulis (Basle, 1521) was printed as the fourth Decade, describing the voyages of Francisco Hernández de Córdoba, Juan de Grijalva, and Hernán Cortés. 
 The fifth Decade (1523) dealt with the conquest of the Aztec Empire and the circumnavigation of the world by Ferdinand Magellan. 
 The sixth Decade (1524) gave an account of Dávila's discoveries on the west coast of America.  
 The seventh Decade (1525) had collected descriptions of the customs of the natives in present-day South Carolina, including the "Testimony of Francisco de Chicora", a Native American taken captive there; as well as those of natives in Florida, Haiti, Cuba, and Darién.
 The eighth Decade (1525) told the story of the march of Cortés against Olit.

In 1530 the eight Decades were published together for the first time at Alcalá.  Later editions of single or of all the Decades appeared at Basel (1533), Cologne (1574), Paris (1587), and Madrid (1892). A German translation was published in Basle in 1582; a French one by Gaffarel in Recueil de voyages et de documents pour servir à l'histoire de la Geographie (Paris, 1907).

The first three decades were translated into English by Richard Eden and published in 1555 (found in Arber's The first three English books on America Birmingham, 1885), thus beginning the genre of English discovery travel writing, which stimulated English exploration of the New World. Eden's translations were reprinted with supplementary materials in 1577 by Richard Willes under the new title, The historie of travayle into the West and east Indies. Richard Hakluyt had the remaining five decades translated into English by Michael Lok and published in London in 1612.

Editions
 P. Martyris ab Angleria Mediolonensi. Opera, Legatio babylonica ; Occeani decas ; Poemata ; Epigrammata Jacobũ corumberger (Hispali), 1511. (includes only first Decade)
 Petri martyris. De orbe nouo Decades impressae in contubernio Arnaldi Guillelmi (Alcala), 1516. (includes only first three Decades)
 Petri Martyris ab Angleria Mediolanensis. De orbe nouo Petri Martyris ab Angleria Mediolanensis protonotarij c[a]esaris senatoris decades In aedibus Michaelis Eguia (Compluti), 1530.
 Petri Martyris ab Angleria Mediolanen. De rebus oceanicis & Orbe nouo decades tres Apud Ioannem Bebelium (Basileae), 1533.
 Peter Martyr of Angleria. The decades of the newe worlde or weſt India conteynyng the nauigations and conqueſtes of the Spanyardes with the particular deſcription of the moſte ryche and large landes and Ilands lately founde in the weſt Ocean perteynyng to the inheritaunce of the kinges of Spayne, translated by Richard Eden, William Powell (London), 1555.
 Peter Martyr d'Anghiera, De orbe novo, translated from the Latin with notes and introduction by Francis Augustus MacNutt (2 vol.), Putnam (New York), 1912.
 Peter Martyr d'Anghiera, Decadas del nuevo mundo, 1944.
 Petrus Martyr de Anghieria, Opera: Legatio Babylonica, De Orbe novo decades octo, Opus Epistolarum, Graz: Akademische Druck- U. Verlagsanstalt, 1966

Notes

References
 
 
 Perna, Carlos Gabriel, Algunos problemas en torno a las "Décadas del Nuevo Mundo" de Pedro Mártir de Anglería. GRIN Verlag, 2007.

This article incorporates text from the 1913 Catholic Encyclopedia article "Peter Martyr d'Anghiera" by Otto Hartig, a publication now in the public domain.

1511 books
16th-century Latin books
Travel books
Anthologies
Explorers of Central America
Explorers of South America
Historiography of the Americas
Historians of Latin America
Conquistadors
Latin texts
Discoverers